Istres Provence Handball is a handball club from Istres, France. Currently, Istres Provence Handball competes in the French First League of Handball.

Crest, colours, supporters

Naming history

Kits

Team

Current squad 

Squad for the 2022–23 season

Technical staff
 Head Coach:  Gilles Derot

Transfers
Transfers for the 2022–23 season: 

 Joining
  Xoan Ledo (GK) (from  Bidasoa Irún) 
  Alejandro Márquez Coloma (RB) (from  BM Granollers) 
  Oliver Nøddesbo Eggert (LB) (from  SønderjyskE Håndbold) 
  Lucas Vanegue (CB) (to  JS Cherbourg)

 Leaving
  Guillaume Crépain (CB) (retires)
  Arnaud Tabarand (GK) (to  Cesson Rennes MHB) 
  Andréa Guillaume (RW) (to  Limoges Handball)  Oussama Hosni (RB) (to  RK Eurofarm Pelister) 
  Jakob Mikkelsen (RB) (to  FC Porto)  Juan José Fernández (LB) (to  BM Ciudad Encantada) Honors 
Coupe de la Ligue: 1Winner : 2009

LNH Division 2: 2Champion'' : 1995, 2018

Former club members

Notable former players

  Théo Derot (2014–2015, 2019)
  Frédéric Dole (1999-2004)
  Christian Gaudin (1995–1997)
  Yann Genty (2010–2012)
  Vincent Gérard (2008-2010)
  Samuel Honrubia (2021-)
  Frédéric Louis (1998-2000)
  Bruno Martini (1994-1995)
  Olivier Maurelli (2000–2002)
  Sébastien Mongin (2000–2004)
  Laurent Munier (1996-1997)
  Raoul Prandi (1998-2000)
  Luc Tobie (2009–2012)
  Omar Benali (2008-2009)
  Messaoud Berkous (2021-)
  Sassi Boultif (2008-2012)
  Hichem Daoud (2016-2021)
  Hichem Kaabeche (2016–2017)
  Tahar Labane (2000–2008)
  Abdelkader Rahim (2015–2016)
  Gonzalo Carou (2014-2015)
  Federico Matías Vieyra (2012–2015)
  Thomas Bauer (2015-2016)
  Thomas Bolaers (2009-2010)
  Bram Dewit (2013-2014)
  Erwin Feuchtmann (2018-2019)
  Zlatko Saračević (1995-1997)
  David Juříček (2003-2004)
  Tomáš Řezníček (2012–2014)
  Petr Štochl (2004-2006)
  Jiří Vítek (2004-2007)
  Andrea Parisini (2019-)
  Ingars Dude (2013-2015)
  Vasko Ševaljević (2019-2021)
  Alexandru Dedu (1996-1997)
  Ibrahima Diaw (2009-2011)
  Aljoša Rezar (2013-2014)
  Nebojša Stojinović (2001-2004)
  Stefan Vujić (2014-2015)
  Aleksandar Stojanović (handballer) (2018-2019)
  Kamel Alouini (2008-2010)
  Mehdi Harbaoui (2014-2020)
  Oussama Hosni (2019-2022)

Former coaches

References

External links 
 
 

French handball clubs
Sport in Bouches-du-Rhône